Tanay, also spelled "Taney", is a hamlet located in the municipality of Vouvry, in Switzerland.

References

Villages in Switzerland